Ñanco Lauquen Airport  is a public use airport serving Trenque Lauquen, a town in the Buenos Aires Province of Argentina.

Runway 20 has a  unpaved overrun available.

See also

Transport in Argentina
List of airports in Argentina

References

External links
OpenStreetMap - Ñanco Lauquen Airport
OurAirports - Ñanco Lauquen Airport
FallingRain - Ñanco Lauquen Airport

Airports in Argentina
Buenos Aires Province